Wellwood may refer to:

 Wellwood, Fife, a small village to the north of Dunfermline, Fife, Scotland
 Wellwood, Manitoba, an unincorporated community in Canada
 Wellwood Cemetery, a Jewish cemetery in Pinelawn, New York
Caroline Wellwood (1870s-1947), Canadian nurse missionary in china
 James Wellwood (1892-?), Australian World War I flying ace
 James Wellwood (physician) (1652-1727), English physician
 Kyle Wellwood (born 1983), Canadian professional ice hockey player
 Wellwood (film), a science-fiction film